Thymus montanus may refer to one of following Lamiaceae species:

Thymus montanus , a synonym for Clinopodium alpinum subsp. alpinum
Thymus montanus  (illegitimate), a synonym for Thymus pulegioides (large thyme)
Thymus montanus  (illegitimate), a synonym for Satureja montana

References 
Thymus montanus The Plant List.